Neshanic Mills is a historic district on the South Branch Raritan River along River Road and Mill Lane at Neshanic Station, Somerset County, New Jersey. The district was added to the National Register of Historic Places on January 9, 1978 for its significance in engineering, industry, transportation, and settlement. It includes 4 contributing buildings and 2 contributing structures.

Gallery of contributing properties

References

External links
 

Hillsborough Township, New Jersey
Branchburg, New Jersey
National Register of Historic Places in Somerset County, New Jersey
Historic districts on the National Register of Historic Places in New Jersey
Grinding mills on the National Register of Historic Places in New Jersey
New Jersey Register of Historic Places
Buildings and structures in Somerset County, New Jersey